Persatuan Sepakbola Kota Kupang (simply known as PSKK) is an Indonesian football club based in Kupang, East Nusa Tenggara. They currently compete in the Liga 3 and their homeground is Oepoi Stadium.

Players

Current squad

References

External links

Kupang
Football clubs in Indonesia
Football clubs in East Nusa Tenggara
Association football clubs established in 1996
1996 establishments in Indonesia